, son of Kujō Hisatada and adopted son of Takatsukasa Sukehiro, was a kazoku Duke of the Meiji period who served in Imperial Japanese Army. Nobusuke and Nobuhiro were his sons.

Family

His son was Toshimichi Takatsukasa (d. 1966), who was married to Kazuko Takatsukasa (1929-1989; formerly Kazuko, Princess Taka).
They had no children, but adopted a son named Ogyū-Matsudaira, Naotake.

References
  (the source claims that he was adopted by Takatsukasa Masamichi, while the other source (that is, w:ja:鷹司煕通) says he was actually adopted by Takatsukasa Sukehiro.)
 Japanese Wikipedia

1855 births
1918 deaths
Fujiwara clan
Takatsukasa family